List of African American pioneers of Colorado includes a list of early settlers or notable "first" figures in Colorado's history. The list includes women inducted into the Colorado Women's Hall of Fame, like Clara Brown and Justina Ford.

Where there are existing articles, sources are found in the articles.

See also
 Barney L. Ford Building, National Register of Historic Places, stop on the Underground Railroad
 Cold Spring Mountain where Isom Dart operated a ranch and was killed for rustling.
 Dearfield, Colorado, one of 14 western towns to create communities for African Americans, as inspired by Booker T. Washington, it is now a ghost town
 The Denver Star, Black newspaper from 1888 until 1963
 Five Points, Denver neighborhood of Denver that was inhabited by African Americans
 Fort Garland in Costilla County - From 1876 to 1879, black Buffalo Soldiers were stationed at the fort
 History of slavery in Colorado
 Lincoln Hills was opened in 1922 by black entrepreneurs from Denver's Five Points, Denver neighborhood to provide food and lodging for traveling African Americans

References

People from Colorado
19th-century African-American people
American pioneers
Colorado history-related lists
Lists of African-American people
African-American history of Colorado